Eliminator is a shooter game developed by Magenta Software and published by Psygnosis for PlayStation and Microsoft Windows in 1998–1999.

Reception

The PlayStation version received unfavorable reviews according to the review aggregation website GameRankings.

References

External links
 

1998 video games
Magenta Software games
Multiplayer and single-player video games
PlayStation (console) games
Psygnosis games
Shooter video games
Video games developed in the United Kingdom
Windows games